Pseudobrevicoceras is an extinct genus of nautilitoid cephalopods in the order Oncocerida. The familial position is undetermined.

Externally Pseudobrevicoceras resembles Brevicoceras, an oncocerid in the Brevicoceratidae, in having a curved, expanded, breviconic phragmocone with straight, transverse sutures.

See also

List of nautiloids

References

 Sweet, Walter C. 1964. Nautiloidea-Oncocerida. Treatise on Invertebrate Paleontology, Part K. Geological Society of America and University of Kansas Press. 
 Sepkoski, J.J. Jr. 2002. A compendium of fossil marine animal genera. D.J. Jablonski & M.L. Foote (eds.). Bulletins of American Paleontology 363: 1–560.
 See also List of nautiloids

Prehistoric nautiloid genera